Nehru Gram Bharati (Deemed to be University), also known as Nehru Gram Bharati University (NGBU) is a research-based Deem to be University in the city of Allahabad, Uttar Pradesh state of India. The university was established on 26 July 1962 by the late Jawahar Lal Nehru. All its admissions and courses are carried out in the name of Nehru Gram Bharati University, Allahabad.

Accreditation and affiliations 
The university is a registered society, with number 1117/2006-2007. It has been assessed as B+ by the National Assessment and Accreditation Council.

History 
The university was established by the then Prime Minister of India; the late Jawahar Lal Nehru at his village near Jamunipur-Kotwa, which was inside his Parliamentary Constituency. Nehru addressed the gathering on the day of the conventional occasion and emphasized the need to foster the technical, vocational and professional education thus by establishing an institute. Nehru further promised his electorate to not send the children of farmers to the other big cities to pursue higher education, instead they would get the quality education and would be better trained within the rural institute at Nehru Gram Bharati University which was setup in a village at that time and also that such students after finishing their education would get better employment opportunities in their own village.

Administration and faculty 
Sanjay Kumar Srivastava  is the vice-chancellor and J.N. Mishra the chancellor of the university.

Academic programs 
The university offers the following academic programs:

Undergraduate programs

 Bachelor of Computer Applications (BCA)
 Bachelor of Business Administration (BBA)
Bachelor of Arts / Bachelor of Performing Arts (BA / BPA)
 Bachelor of Technology (B.Tech. in Electrical, Mechanical, Computer)
 Bachelor of Science (BSc. with Mathematics, Physics & Chemistry)
 Bachelor of Arts + Bachelor of Law (BA. LLB)
 Bachelor of Education (B.Ed.)
 Bachelor of Laws (L.L.B.)

Postgraduate Programs

 Master of Education (M.Ed.)
 Master of Arts (MA with chosen specialization)
 Master of Science (MSc. with Mathematics, Physics or Chemistry)
 Master of Business Administration (MBA)
 Master of Commerce (M.Com.)

Diploma Programs

 Postgraduate Diploma in Computer Applications (PG. Dip. CA.)
 Postgraduate Diploma in Journalism & Mass Communication (PG. Dip. JMC.)
 Postgraduate Diploma in Retail Management (PG. Dip. Mgmt.).

References 

Universities and colleges in Allahabad
Deemed universities in Uttar Pradesh
Monuments and memorials to Jawaharlal Nehru
1962 establishments in Uttar Pradesh
Educational institutions established in 1962